Tughrassen is a small village located 17 km south of Tafraout in the Anti-Atlas mountain range in Morocco.

References

Populated places in Tiznit Province